Thomas Reid (26 December 1881 – 28 January 1963) was a British diplomat and politician. He was Labour Member of Parliament (MP) for  Swindon from 1945 to 1955.

Palestine
Reid was known for his strong views against the division of Palestine under the British Mandate for Palestine. In late 1947, a month after the publication of the United Nations Partition Plan for Palestine, he stated in a long speech to parliament:
"It is an iniquitous scheme, and the chief instigator is a country for whom I have the profoundest love and admiration, next after my own, namely America. I do not believe all the tales about America, about the almighty dollar, and the rest. Americans are a very noble people and have more idealism than most nations of the world. But I have a criticism to make of America on this occasion, or at least of the American delegates to U.N.O. What is the motive? Let us be frank about it. One of the chief motives is that the Jews have a controlling voice in the election for the President in the States of New York, Illinois, Ohio and elsewhere in America. I suggest that the chief reason for this evil proposal of U.N.O. is that the political parties in America, or their party machines, are partly at the electoral mercy of the Jews. That is public knowledge."

References

External links 
 

1881 births
1963 deaths
UK MPs 1945–1950
UK MPs 1950–1951
UK MPs 1951–1955
Labour Party (UK) MPs for English constituencies